A minute is a unit of time in a basketball game. Technically, just a minimum of one second in silo (1-59) would count as one minute of playing time. There are forty-eight minutes in each NBA basketball game, excluding overtime. As five people from one team will be on the court at any given time, a total of 240 minutes can be distributed in regulation among a team in an NBA basketball game.

For players, the total number of minutes played in a season—and the average number of minutes played per game—are both tracked as statistics.

Leaders

Kareem Abdul-Jabbar is the all-time leader in minutes played with 57,446. Karl Malone (54,852), Dirk Nowitzki (51,368), LeBron James (active), Kevin Garnett (50,418), Jason Kidd (50,111), and Elvin Hayes (50,000) are the only other players with 50,000 or more minutes played in a career. Most of Abdul-Jabbar and Hayes's minutes can largely be attributed to the amount of playing time that star players had in the late 1960s and early-to-mid 1970s.

References

Basketball statistics